The More You Suffer is the fourth full-length album by the Swedish metal band Carnal Forge.

Track listing 
"H.B.F. Suicide" - 3:23
"Deathblow" - 3:46
"Ripped & Torn" - 3:43
"Destroy Life" - 3:35
"Cursed" - 3:17
"Divine Killing Breed Machine" - 3:56
"Deep Rivers of Blood" - 4:37
"Breaking Boundaries" - 3:37
"Into Oblivion" - 4:01
"My Bloody Rampage" - 3:53
"Baptized in Fire" - 3:19
"Let Me Bleed" - 3:25

Japanese Version Bonus Tracks

 13. "Hits You Like a Hammer"
 14. "Bulletproof God Material"

Sources
 [ Allmusic album entry]

2003 albums
Carnal Forge albums